Assembly may refer to:

Organisations and meetings
 Deliberative assembly, a gathering of members who use parliamentary procedure for making decisions
 General assembly, an official meeting of the members of an organization or of their representatives
 House of Assembly, a name given to the legislature or lower house of a bicameral legislature
 National Assembly, either a legislature or the lower house of a bicameral legislature in some countries
 National Assembly (disambiguation)
 Popular assembly, a localized citizen gathering to address issues of importance to the community
 Qahal, or assembly, an Israelite organizational structure
 People's Assembly (disambiguation) 
 Assembly of Experts, the deliberative body empowered to designate and dismiss the Supreme Leader of Iran
 Freedom of assembly, the individual right to come together and collectively express, promote, pursue and defend common interests
 School assembly, a gathering of all or part of a school

Science, technology and manufacturing
 Assembly, the act of combining components in manufacturing, or the resulting assemblage 
 Assembly modelling, technology and methods used by computer-aided design and product visualization software
 Assembly line, a manufacturing process in which parts are added to a product in a sequential manner
 Self-assembly, a process in which disordered components form an organized structure without external direction
 Sequence assembly, a process to reconstruct a long DNA sequence from numerous fragments
 Assembly rules, set of controversial rules in ecology proposed by Jared Diamond to explain species community composition
 Assembly of a virion (Virology)

Computing
 Assembly language, a programming language providing symbolic representation of machine code
 Assembly (programming), a runtime unit of types and resources with the same version
 Assembly (CLI), an XML wrapper around a compiled code library (the XML-wrapped-library itself is also sometimes referred to as an assembly) used for deployment, versioning, and security
 Assembly (demo party), an annual computer event in Finland

Arts and entertainment
 Assemble (collective), a London-based collective active in art, architecture and design
 Assembly (events promoter), one of the main programmers at the Edinburgh Festival Fringe
 Assembly (film), a 2007 Chinese war drama
 Assembly (TV series), a 2015 television series

Music
 Assemble (album), an album by Grown at Home
 Assembly (bugle call), a call used to bring in a group of soldiers
 Assembly (John Foxx album), 1992
 Assembly (Theatre of Tragedy album)
 The Assembly, a synth pop project started in 1983
 Assembly, a 2021 compilation album by Joe Strummer

Other uses
 Assembly station, a rapid transit station in Boston, Massachusetts, US
 Assembly Bristol, an office block in England, UK

See also
 
 
 Assemble (disambiguation)
 Assembler (disambiguation)
 Assembly Member (disambiguation)
 Asse
 Brice Assie
 Assi (disambiguation)
 Hassy